The GiMA Best Duo/Group Song is given by Global Indian Music Academy as a part of its annual Global Indian Music Academy Awards. This award started from 2016.

List of winners
 2016 Brijesh Shandilya & Swati Sharma for "Banno" – Tanu Weds Manu Returns
Shreya Ghoshal & Vaishali Mhade for "Pinga" – Bajirao Mastani
 Arijit Singh & Tulsi Kumar for "Soch Na Sake" – Airlift
 Armaan Malik & Neeti Mohan for "Tumhe Apna Banane Ka" – Hate Story 3
 Sonu Nigam & Shreya Ghoshal for "Tere Bin" – Wazir
 Priya Saraiya & Divya Kumar for "Sun Saathiya" - ABCD 2

See also
 Bollywood
 Cinema of India

References

Global Indian Music Academy Awards